Robocar Poli is a South Korean animated children's television series created by RoiVisual. The series released its first episode on Educational Broadcasting System (EBS) in 2011, and has aired for five seasons. Robocar Poli consists of 120 eleven-minute episodes.

Synopsis 
In Brooms Town, a small town with a capable rescue team, there are always accidents such as a car sliding off a cliff in the rain, a car crash, or a child locked in a firehouse. In every episode, the town's rescue team saves characters from trouble. At the end of each episode, the rescue team strongly advises the characters who are in danger and viewing children.

Characters

Main 
 Poli (voiced by Marc Thompson) is a blue and white police car. Poli boasts the fastest top speed. He leads the rescue team with great mental strength and persistence, protects the village from various dangers, and takes responsibility for traffic safety. Poli often gives simple advice on basic safety tips to those willing to listen, and he often makes the plans on a mission.
 Amber (voiced by Rebecca Soler) is a pink and white ambulance van. Wise and clever, Amber provides clues to solutions in situations using her ample knowledge and quick judgment when the rescue team is in trouble. She protects the lives of friends with various medical tools and takes responsibility for safety accidents in daily life. Amber is knowledgeable in caring for plants and animals as well as people and vehicles, but she also has comparable computer skills. Amber was given a slight cosmetic change in Season 3, replacing the red cross on her lightbar with a red letter A. She is The Friendliest Ambulance of All-Time.
 Roy (voiced by Jason Griffin) is a red and yellow fire truck. Roy is very big and strong. He calmly and reliably solves problems in any rescue situation and is responsible for fire and electrical safety problems in the village. Roy uses a series of alternate attachments that include a crane arm, a portable hoist usable in robot mode, and a cherry picker in addition to his usual ladder. He also pulls much of the trailers the team uses on their missions. Additionally, he is physically the most powerful member of the team and carries a fire hose that sprays anything that can flow in a stream-like form.
 Helly (voiced by Kate Bristol) is a green and yellow helicopter flying through the sky. Armed with a positive and quick witted personality, he livens up the entire rescue team. He is supposedly the youngest member of the Brooms Town Rescue Team. His high performance search and information transmission abilities make him the messenger of choice of the rescue team. Helly uses his robot form more often than the others, as he has very few alternative ways to move on the ground. He also uses many special tools and equipment in his work. Parts of his legs were recolored in Season 3, as they a notably more grey in color.
 Jin is the leader of the rescue squad and she wears orange and yellow clothes. Unlike the other members of the team, she is a human being rather than a machine; she is an inventor, having made several gadgets that have help the team, though not all of them have been considered successes.

Mountain Rescue Team 
The Mountain Rescue Team are a trio of three members who come from the neighboring town of Treasureville. They were introduced in Season 4.
 Carry is a dark blue aircraft modelled on a Bell Boeing V-22 Osprey. He is the strongest member of the Mountain Rescue Team, and often helps the Broomstown Rescue Team when in need.
 Mark is an orange pickup truck resembling a Colorado. Mark is the leader of the Mountain Rescue Team because of his brave personality. He always supports The Rescue Team during missions along with his best friend Bucky. He was introduced in Season 4.
 Bucky is a yellow dune buggy car who is a member of the Mountain Rescue Team. He is best friends with Mark and The Rescue Team and Jin. He also helps The Rescue Team too. He was introduced in Season 4.

Desert Rescue Team 
The Desert Rescue Team are a trio of three members who can all transform into robots and live in the neighboring town of Sandville. They were introduced in Season 5.
 Keaton is a member of the Desert Rescue Team. Medical, telecommunication and fueling in the desert that can also be transformed into a mobile base!
 Droney is a drone belonging to the Sandvile Rescue Team. Responsible for desert.
 Sandy is the leader of the Desert Rescue Team. Responsible for desert security strategy and command! Sports enthusiast with innate athleticism.

Spin-off Characters 
 Kevin (voiced by Grey Griffin) is a boy with blonde hair. He only appeared in Traffic Safety with Poli.
 Susie (voiced by Cristina Vee) is Kevin's younger sister.
 Sally (voiced by Lisa Ortiz) is Kevin and Susie's mother.
 Bob  (voiced by Eric Stuart) is Kevin and Susie's father.
 Elizabeth is Kevin's cat (accidentally called Mittens by Sally).
 Doug (voiced by Collin Dean) is a boy with brown hair and freckles. He is also best friends with Kevin.
 Jenny (voiced by Michele Knotz) is a girl with red hair. She is also Kevin and Doug's classmate.
 Cindy the pizza delivery girl (voiced by Rachael Lillis) delivers pizzas to everybody.
 Peter (voiced by Veronica Taylor) is a boy with blonde hair. He only appeared in Fire Safety with Roy and Daily Life Safety with Amber.
 Lucy (voiced by Liliana Mumy) is Peter's younger sister.
 Robert (voiced by Bill Rogers) is Peter and Lucy's father.
 Sarah (voiced by Amy Birnbaum) is Peter and Lucy's mother.
 Buddy is Peter's dog.
 Johnny (voiced by Tara Strong) is a boy with brown hair. He is also best friends with Peter.
 Ralph (voiced by Jason Griffith) is Johnny's Father. He has a moustache.
 Cindy (voiced by Emily Bauer) is a girl with orange hair. Cindy is good at studying and sports. She is prim and very decisive. She is also Peter, Johnny, and Charles' classmate.
 Monica (voiced by Eileen Stevens) is Cindy's mother.
 Charles (voiced by Ted Lewis) is a boy with black hair and glasses. He is also Peter, Johnny, and Cindy's classmate. Charles' hobby is reading fairy tales; he's a rather nerdy smart student. He is more quiet and timid than his other friends.
 Tommy (voiced by Jimmy Zoppi) is a firefighter. He doesn't live in Broom's Town.

Villains 
 Truck-X is a kidnapper truck, who has been disguising himself as all kinds of trucks (such as a toy delivery truck), he only appeared in Brave Mr. Musty. He tricked Mini and her friends by being a toy delivery truck, and kidnapped them, but got caught and arrested by Poli and his teammates.
 Poacher is a hunter jeep, who has been hunting for animals. In his only appearance in Move Out! Battle in the Woods, Poacher hunted the deer, but got caught and arrested by the Brooms Town rescue team and the mountain rescue team.
 James is a stranger, who has been up to no good, he only appeared in Don't Go with Strangers. He tricked Peter and Johnny by being an ice cream man, and kidnapped Peter, when they mentioned the rescue team, but got caught and arrested by Poli, when Johnny called for help.

Other 
 Annie is best friends with Mary. She likes to hangout with her, But only on occasions.
 Andy is best friends with Mary, Tim, Toby, and Annie.
 Benny is a Hyundai Porter who is nice, neat and very frantic. He likes to hang out with his best friends, Mini and Rody.
 Betty is Mr. Wheeler's granddaughter, who lives in a different country.
 Bruner is a yellow backhoe loader who is a member of The Construction Team. However, he looks more like a robot than a backhoe loader. He is also the big cousin of Bruny.
 Bruny is a yellow loader who is the little cousin of Bruner. He is also too young to be a member of The Construction Team.
 Camp is a cyan recreational vehicle who is a camper, He always has been camping in the woods since when he was little. He was mean and nasty, but for now, he is now friends with Poli and his teammates.
 Cap is a yellow taxi who is best friends with Posty. But sometimes they argue at each other, Although they both stay the same.
 Cici is a container ship who works at the Harbour. She is a member of the Harbour Team and is friends with Lefy, Leky, and Lety.
 Cleany is a green street sweeper who is sometimes clumsy, But is good with his friends and his job as cleaning all over Broom's Town.
 Daisy is a light pink recreational vehicle.
 Dumpoo is a dump truck who is the leader of The Construction Team, He is also best friends with Titan.
 Jessie wears glasses, and likes to go for a walk with her mom.
 Leky, Lefy and Lety are a trio of three cranes who are part of The Harbor Team. Leky is yellow, Lefy is orange, and Lety is light blue.
 Lifty is a Forklift who is a member of The Harbor Team, he is friends with Cleany and Terry.
 Luke is a black boy.
 Marine is a lifeboat who is a member of The Harbor Team, he is a lucky sailor who is sometimes the guardian of the crew, he also has a pet dolphin named Ming Ming.
 Mary is a girl and calm, shy and a good friend to The Rescue Team. She is well-behaved just like her friend Annie.
 Max is a lazy road roller/steamroller who is part of The Construction Team. 
 Mickey is a Cement mixer who is part of The Construction Team. He is bad at ball games (the reason for why he sometimes berates his friends) and his hobby is listening to music. He is not a main member of the Construction Team, but he is friends with them.
 Mini (voiced by Lisa Ortiz) is a Kei car who is sweet, shy and soft. She is best friends with Rody and Benny and the granddaughter of Musty.
 Ming Ming is Marine's dolphin.
 Mr. Builder is the master of The Construction Team. He is tough and short tempered and often shouts at them. He thinks of Mickey as immature.
 Mr. Wheeler is the store clerk of Brooms Town. He is sometimes snobbish, sarcastic and narcissistic, But he is good to Jin and The Rescue Team for his commands and actions. He is also Betty's grandfather.
 Ms. Belle is the harbor master.
 Mr. Musty is a navy Lincoln Mark VIII who is elderly, loyal and calm. He is the mayor of Brooms Town and is the grandfather of Mini.
 Poke is an excavator who is a member of The Construction Team. Unlike the rest of the characters, he doesn't talk (although he does mumble).
 Posty is a mail auto rickshaw on three wheels who is a cheap, spectacular and vehicle. He is best friends with Cap and his job is delivering mail. He is a Piaggio Ape. 
 Rody (voiced by Sarah Natochenny) is a Hyundai Porter who is cool, selfish and mean. But he is good to his friends, Mini and Benny.
 Rose and Marie (voiced by ) is a 
 Ryan wears glasses, he has been writing "thank you" letter, now he's learned to write someone's address, and a return address.
 Sam is Annie and Mary's first classmate.
 School B is a School bus who is like a teacher to the kids and always make good deeds and starts dropping off and picking up kids from school.
 Spooky (voiced by Billy Bob Thompson) is a tow truck (specifically a 'boom' truck) who is mischievous, stubborn and timid, But he is always helpful and is a good friend to The Rescue Team.
 Stacy is the owner of the battery recharger station. She has brown hair and wears a dark-magenta outfit.
 Terry is a container semi tractor who is the leader of The Harbor Team and is a loyal friend to the crane triplets and is best friends with Lifty.
 Tim is Annie and Mary's second classmate.
 Titan is a large dump truck who is best friends with Dumpoo. And a member of The Construction Team. He is not a main part of the Construction Team, but is friends with them.
 Toby is Annie and Mary's third classmate.
 Tracky is a tractor who is a farmer who works in a barnyard with a farm. He is also like a boss to the crew.
 Trino is a train who is a fabulous new friend to come to Brooms Town Railroad Station.
 Whooper is a transit bus who is a wise villager like village guy in the neighborhood city of Broom's Town.

Production
While in production, this series was selected for the section of full-length animation at Global Animation Project 2009 hosted by Korea Creative Content Agency (KOCCA), under the title of PiyoPiyo Friends.

Broadcast
In the later half of 2011, the films were exported from South Korea to France. Internationally, the program currently airs on French and Taiwanese channels. The series aired in Japan on TV Tokyo between April 6, 2013, and September 24, 2014. It also aired in South Korea channel on Tooniverse.

An English dub of Robocar Poli airs in American  on Okto. In Canada, it debuted on Treehouse TV on January 6, 2018, While in French Canada, the series premiered on Télé-Québec and Teletoon on June 28, 2020.
 It is also available on Netflix and YouTube. A separate British dub of the series began airing on Nick Jr. Too in the UK starting February 27, 2017. In February 2021, It Will Be Leaving Netflix As of March 28, 2021. due to repairs, it only left for 3 days. returned on March 31, 2021. In The United States it aired on Nick Jr. on June 15, 2015, for Sometime.

Episodes

Reception
This series has had high ratings in South Korea, and became the chief rival of Pororo the Little Penguin which had been number one in the industry. Related merchandise includes cakes, toys, books, and apparel. In South Korea, Poli is frequently called 폴총리 (Pol-chong-ri) which means "Poli, the Minister of Children". This follows Pororo which is famously known as 뽀통령 (Po-tong-ryeong), meaning "Pororo, the President of Children".

Merchandise
On March 12, 2013, Korea Post issued commemorative stamps for the series. As the third installment of the "Korean-Made Characters Series Stamps", Robocar Poli was introduced, following the introduction of Pororo the Little Penguin and Pucca. Two million copies of the stamps were printed for sale (10 copies per set).

Spin-offs

Traffic Safety with Poli

«Traffic Safety with Poli»() is a first spin-off of the original series. As part of Hyundai Motors' global corporate social responsibility project with RoiVisual and EBS, the series was produced to educate children on the importance of traffic safety, and has aired for two seasons. The first season of the spin-off was shown as six 11-minute episodes, each with two segments. In Singapore, it debuted on Okto on December 27, 2015. It premiered in Canada on Treehouse TV on February 2, 2019.

Fire Safety with Roy 
«Fire Safety with Roy» is the second spin-off of the original series. Centered on Roy, it debuted in August 2017 on EBS. In Singapore, it debuted on Okto on December 8, 2018.

Daily Life Safety with Amber 
«Daily Life Safety with Amber» is the third spin-off of the original series. Centered on Amber, it debuted in August 2018 on EBS. In Singapore, it debuted on Channel 5's Okto block on October 19, 2019. In America, it debuted on YouTube August 9, 2019.

Special spin-off

SongSong Museum

«SongSong Museum» is the special musical spin-off of the original series. Centered on Rescue team, it debuted in July 2020 on EBS. It comprises 25 popular nursery rhymes and 1 creative song in 26 episodes.

References

External links 
  
  on EBS 

2010s South Korean animated television series
Animated television series about children
Animated television series about robots
Computer-animated television series
South Korean children's animated adventure television series
South Korean children's animated comic science fiction television series
South Korean children's animated science fantasy television series
Animated preschool education television series
2010s preschool education television series
2020s preschool education television series
Television series about shapeshifting
English-language television shows